The 1986 FIVB Men's World Championship was the eleventh edition of the tournament, organised by the world's governing body, the FIVB. It was held from 25 September to 5 October 1986 in France.

Qualification

Squads

Results

First round

Pool A
Location: Montpellier

|}

|}

Pool B
Location: Tourcoing

|}

|}

Pool C
Location: Clermont-Ferrand

|}

|}

Pool D
Location: Orléans

|}

|}

Second round
The results and the points of the matches between the same teams that were already played during the first round are taken into account for the second round.

1st–12th pools

Pool E
Location: Toulouse

|}

|}

Pool F
Location: Nantes

|}

|}

13th–16th places
Location: Évreux

|}

|}

Final round

9th–12th places

9th–12th semifinals

|}

11th place match

|}

9th place match

|}

5th–8th places

5th–8th semifinals

|}

7th place match

|}

5th place match

|}

Finals

Semifinals

|}

3rd place match

|}

Final

|}

Final standing

Awards
 Most Valuable Player
  Philippe Blain

External links
 Federation Internationale de Volleyball

W
V
V
FIVB Volleyball Men's World Championship
Volleyball in Paris